Kohima Ao Baptist Church is a Baptist church located in Midland Ward, Kohima, Nagaland, India affiliated with the Ao Baptist Arogo Mungdang. KABA was one of the first Ao churches established outside the Ao region. It serves as the main church building of the Ao Nagas residing in Kohima.

History
The Kohima Ao Baptist Church was established in the year 1939 where 9 people from the Ao community started the Church in Kohima. Dismantling of the old church building began on 1 April 2011 and a new building was dedicated on 28 April 2019 by senior pastor Rev. M. Asangba Longkümer.

Architecture
Located at Midland Ward, Kohima, the new church building was constructed at a cost of over ₹26 crore and has a seating capacity of 3500 including the balcony.

Membership
Today the church membership has 3500 households and a total of 9000+ baptised members with several sectoral fellowships across the city.

Gallery

See also
 Ao Baptist Arogo Mungdang
 Christianity in Nagaland

References

External links 

 Kohima Ao Baptist Church Official Website
 Kohima Ao Baptist Arogo on YouTube

Churches completed in 2019
Buildings and structures in Kohima
2019 establishments in Nagaland
Churches in Nagaland
Kohima
Baptist churches in India